Lucy Alexander (born 3 April 1970) is an English television presenter, known for appearing on the BBC One property show Homes Under the Hammer.

Early life 
Alexander was born in East Dulwich, London. She graduated from the London Studio Centre in drama and dance. One of her friends there was actress Tamzin Outhwaite. In 1991, Alexander appeared in the music video for Chesney Hawkes hit single The One and Only, alongside Saffron (later of Republica fame) and Hawkes.
She has an older sister, Sally.

Presenting career
Alexander has presented on Nickelodeon, as well as Channel 5's morning children's block Milkshake! and It's a Knockout. Alexander was also one of the main presenters on the now defunct TV Travelshop Channel which was on air from April 1998 to March 2005. Alexander co-presented the BBC's Homes Under the Hammer alongside Martin Roberts from its launch in 2003 until 2016, when she left the programme.

In July 2016, Alexander presented the first episode of the 5-part BBC documentary series Matron, Medicine and Me: 70 Years of the NHS in which she explored the current and historical medical treatment of patients with disabilities in the UK and described her own family's experience of the National Health Service after her daughter was diagnosed with transverse myelitis. In 2017, she appeared in Channel 4's Tried and Tasted: The Ultimate Shopping List. She began presenting the daytime Channel 4 series Best of Both Worlds in 2017, replacing Kirstie Allsopp.  In 2017, she co-presented Lost and Found on Channel 4 daytime with Simon O'Brien.

Personal life
Alexander was introduced to ex-Premier League footballer Stewart Castledine by mutual friend, radio presenter Robin Banks. She married Castledine in 2000 in Richmond, West London The couple have two children. They live in Thames Ditton, Surrey.

Filmography

References

External links

1970 births
Living people
English television presenters
People from East Dulwich
Television personalities from London